Aspitha is a Neotropical genus of firetips in the family Hesperiidae.

Species
 Aspitha agenoria (Hewitson, 1876) Bolivia, Peru
 Aspitha aspitha (Hewitson, [1866]) Brazil, Surinam, Guyane
 Aspitha bassleri (Bell, 1940) Peru
 Aspitha leander (Boullet, 1912) Colombia

References
 Natural History Museum Lepidoptera genus database
 Aspitha on funet.

External links
images representing Aspitha at Consortium for the Barcode of Life

Pyrginae
Hesperiidae of South America
Hesperiidae genera